Ek Se Badhkar Ek is  a 2004 Hindi-language comedy film directed by Kundan Shah and stars Suniel Shetty and Raveena Tandon. The film was produced by Pammi Sandhu and score and soundtrack was composed by Anand Raj Anand. The film was released on 17 September 2004.

Plot 
Advocate Anand Mathur draws up a will for his client, while reading the novel The Godfather, and erroneously makes out the will with a provision that the beneficiary must be a criminal Don in order to inherit the billions of rupees. The beneficiary is a bachelor named Rahul Bhargav, who wants no part of being a Don, criminal or anything of the sort. His police inspector girlfriend, Kanchan Dhillon, has set her sights on the billions and makes him change his mind. She assures him that she will use her influence and ensure that he gets to be the Don in no time at all, little realizing that this will change their lives forever, and make them captives in neighbouring and hostile Pakistan.

Cast 
 Suniel Shetty as Rahul Bhargav
 Raveena Tandon as Insp. Kanchan Dhillon
 Shekhar Suman as Anand Mathur
 Isha Koppikar as Tracy / Shalini Mathur
 Asrani as Don Srikant Ramprasad
 Deepak Shirke as Deka
 Makrand Deshpande as Krishnamurthy
 Rana Jung Bahadur as Jaleel
 Sadashiv Amrapurkar as Inspector Inamdar
 Shakti Kapoor as Inspector Kaate
 Gulshan Grover as Jindaal
 Dinyar Contractor as Dastoor
 Achyut Potdar as Advocate Nadkarni
 Vivek Shauq

Soundtrack

Reception 
Chitra Mahesh of The Hindu wrote, "Bored? It might be a good idea to go and see Ek Se Badhkar Ek. Because that is the only way you would be motivated to see it." Taran Adarsh of Bollywood Hungama gave the film 1.5 stars out of 5, writing "On the whole, Ek Se Badhkar Ek is no Number Ek entertainer. It falls short of expectations and at best, might appeal to a small segment of audience in metros mainly."  Patcy N of Rediff.com wrote ″Though he tried more than once in his new film, Kundan Shah couldn't create the magic of his debut Jaane Bhi Do Yaaron in Ek Se Badhkar Ek.″

References

External links 
 

2004 films
2000s Hindi-language films
Films scored by Anand Raj Anand
Cross-dressing in Indian films
Films directed by Kundan Shah